Blacked Out is a studio album by American country rap duo Moonshine Bandits from California. It was released on July 17, 2015 via Average Joes Entertainment. It features guest appearances from Bubba Sparxxx, Colt Ford, Crucifix, Demun Jones, Durwood Black, D. Thrash of Jawga Boyz, Jeff McCool, Lenny Cooper, Redneck Souljers, Sarah Ross and The Lacs. The album peaked at number 158 on the Billboard 200 in the United States.

Track listing

Charts

References

2015 albums
Country rap albums
Moonshine Bandits albums
Average Joes Entertainment albums